The 1972 Charlotte Tennis Classic – Doubles was an event of the 1972 Charlotte Tennis Classic tennis tournament played at the Julian J. Clark Tennis Stadium in Charlotte, North Carolina, in the United States from April 18 through April 23, 1972. Marty Riessen and Tony Roche  were the defending champions, but did not compete together in this edition. Tom Okker and Marty Riessen won the doubles title, defeating John Newcombe and Tony Roche in the final, 6–4, 4–6, 7–6.

Draw

References

External links
 ITF tournament edition details

Charlotte Tennis Classic
Charlotte Tennis Classic
1972 in sports in North Carolina